This is a list of electoral results for the Electoral division of Jingili in Northern Territory elections.

Members for Jingili

Election results

Elections in the 1970s

Elections in the 1980s

 Preferences were not distributed.

Elections in the 1990s

References

Northern Territory electoral results by district